The United States Attorney for the Southern District of New York is the chief federal law enforcement officer in eight New York counties: New York (Manhattan), Bronx, Westchester, Putnam, Rockland, Orange, Dutchess and Sullivan. Established by the Judiciary Act of 1789, the office represents the United States government in criminal and civil cases across the country. The SDNY handles a broad array of cases, including but not limited to those involving white collar crime, domestic terrorism, cybercrime, public corruption, organized crime, as well as civil rights disputes.

The Southern District is known for being highly independent and nonpartisan, earning itself the moniker the "Sovereign District of New York". Its resources, culture, and accompanying FBI field office have given the SDNY a reputation for being exceptionally aggressive in its pursuit of criminals. Due to its jurisdiction over the New York City borough of Manhattan, the pre-eminent financial center of the United States of America, the office's incumbent is often nicknamed the "Sheriff of Wall Street".

, the United States Attorney is Damian Williams.

Organization
The Office is organized into two divisions handling civil and criminal matters. The Southern District of New York also has two offices: one in Manhattan, and the other in White Plains. The Office employs approximately 220 Assistant U.S. Attorneys.

List of U.S. Attorneys
In 1814, the District of New York was divided into the Northern and the Southern District.

Notable assistants
Michael F. Armstrong, lawyer
Bob Arum, boxing promoter
Neil Barofsky, special inspector general overseeing the Troubled Asset Relief Program
Bernard Bell, professor at Rutgers School of Law–Newark
Maurene Comey, daughter of former FBI Director James Comey
Thomas E. Dewey, Governor of New York and the unsuccessful Republican candidate for President in 1944 and 1948
Eddie Eagan, former Olympic athlete
Louis Freeh, former director of the Federal Bureau of Investigation
Patrick Fitzgerald, United States Attorney for the Northern District of Illinois
Felix Frankfurter, Associate Justice of the Supreme Court of the United States
John Marshall Harlan II, associate justice, Supreme Court of the United States
Arthur L. Liman, criminal defense attorney
Robert J. McGuire, former New York City Police Commissioner
Michael Mukasey, former United States Attorney General
Thomas Francis Murphy, federal prosecutor and judge in New York City; prosecutor in the two perjury trials of Alger Hiss
Mary Grace Quackenbos, first woman to hold this post in the United States
Charles Rangel, U.S. Representative from Harlem
Henry Dwight Sedgwick, lawyer and author
Franklin A. Thomas, former director of the Ford Foundation
Maya Wiley (born 1964), civil rights activist and lawyer, 2021 mayoral candidate for New York City

In popular culture

Television 
The Showtime drama series Billions is loosely based on Preet Bharara's prosecution of SAC Capital and other hedge funds.

The ABC legal drama For the People depicts new defense attorneys and prosecutors working in the Southern District of New York.

The 2020 Netflix series Fear City: New York vs The Mafia documents the work of the Federal Bureau of Investigation and the Southern District of New York against the Five Families of the Italian American Mafia in the 1980s.

References

External links
United States Attorney for the Southern District of New York Official Website

United States Attorneys for the Southern District of New York
Prosecution